Kent Lake is a lake in Kanabec County, in the U.S. state of Minnesota.

Kent Lake was named for Myron R. Kent, an early settler.

See also
List of lakes in Minnesota

References

Lakes of Minnesota
Lakes of Kanabec County, Minnesota